[[Image:Star's Electric Sitar RD (vertical).jpg|thumb|Star's Electric Sitar, a copy of Coral/Danelectro Electric Sitar 3S19<ref name=VintageDanelectro.com_Sitar>{{cite book |chapter=The Worlds First Electric Sitar |title=Danelectro Bellzouki, Hawaiian Lapsteel, and The Electric Sitar |url=http://vintagedanelectro.com/sitar.html |work=VintageDanelectro.com |quote={{smaller|1=Late 1960s Coral Sitar 3S19 Image Image 1 (with Original Gig Bag), 2, 3, 4 (with Original Hard Case)}} |access-date=2017-11-25}}</ref>]]

An electric sitar is a type of electric guitar designed to mimic the sound of the sitar, a traditional musical instrument of India. Depending on the manufacturer and model, these instruments bear varying degrees of resemblance to the traditional sitar. Most resemble the electric guitar in the style of the body and headstock, though some have a body shaped to resemble that of the sitar (such as a model made by Danelectro).

History
The instrument was developed in the early 1960s by session guitarist Vinnie Bell in partnership with Danelectro and released under the brandname Coral™ in 1967. At the time, many western musical groups began to use the sitar, which is generally considered a difficult instrument to learn. By contrast, the electric sitar, with its standard guitar fretboard and tuning, is a more familiar fret arrangement for a guitarist to play. The twangy sitar-like tone comes from a flat bridge adding the necessary buzz to the guitar strings.

Configuration
In addition to the six playing strings, most electric sitars have sympathetic strings, typically located on the left side of the instrument (though some do not have these). These strings have their own pickups (typically lipstick pickups are used for both sets of strings), and are usually tuned with a harp wrench (a difficult process). A unique type of bridge, a "buzz bridge", developed by Vinnie Bell, helps give the instrument its distinctive sound. Some electric sitars have drone strings in lieu of sympathetic strings. A few models, such as the Jerry Jones "Baby" sitar, lack both sympathetic and drone strings, while still retaining the distinctive buzz bridge.

The "sympathetic" strings on most electric sitars do not resonate strongly enough to match the effect of an acoustic sitar. There are resonant chambers in the solid-body instruments that have Masonite tops, however it is not enough to excite the 13 strings into true sympathy. The strings are tensioned over two rosewood bridges with fret material as saddles so the sound is more like an autoharp than a sitar.

Versions of the electric sitar were also developed mainly in India. These are smaller sized sitars that look like a sitar. These sitars are tuned the same way as the original classical sitar would be tuned.

Usage

Because the tone quality and playing technique differ significantly from that of the sitar, it is typically used in rock, jazz, and fusion styles.  Notable early hit singles featuring electric sitar include Eric Burdon and the Animals' "Monterey",  Joe South's "Games People Play", The Supremes's "No Matter What Sign You Are" (played by Eddie Willis) and Stevie Wonder's "Signed, Sealed, Delivered", B.J. Thomas' "Hooked on a Feeling" (played by Reggie Young), The Spinners' "It's a Shame", The Box Tops "Cry Like a Baby" as well as some sides by The Stylistics and The Delfonics. Also Genesis on the Selling England by the Pound album for the song I Know What I Like (In Your Wardrobe) and Yes on the Relayer album for the song To Be Over.

Other recording artists who have featured the electric sitar include:

 B.J. Thomas on his version of the hit Hooked On A Feeling, the sitar guitar is played by Reggie Young.
 Elvis Presley’s 1969 American Sound recording sessions ("Stranger In My Hometown", "You'll Think Of Me,” “Gentle on My Mind,” and “I’m Movin’ On”), played by Reggie Young, and 1970 Nashville recording sessions (“Snowbird”), played by Harold Bradley.
 Steppenwolf ("Snowblind Friend", played by producer Richard Podolor)
 Mandrake Memorial
 Kronos Quartet
 Genesis (in "I Know What I Like (In Your Wardrobe)", "Dancing with the Moonlit Knight") Steve Hackett plays live.
 Yes (in "Close To The Edge", "Siberian Khatru", "Tales From Topographic Oceans", "To Be Over", "Into The Lens"), Steve Howe plays it and also on his solo albums
 Gary Wilson (musician) Played it, most notably on his 1977 album, You Think You Really Know Me.
 Mike Oldfield used it on "Flying Start" (on Islands)
 The Clash (in "Armagideon Time" and "Charlie Don't Surf")
 Todd Rundgren (on the album Initiation)
 Redbone ("Come and Get Your Love")
 Bo Donaldson and The Heywoods ("Who Do You Think You Are?")
 The Grass Roots "Glory Bound"
 Guns N' Roses (in "Pretty Tied Up")
 Lenny Kravitz ("It Ain't Over 'til It's Over" and "Again")
 Robbie Dupree ("Steal Away")
 Oasis
 Dinosaur Jr. (in "The Wagon")
 R.E.M.
 Metallica (in "Wherever I May Roam")
 Steely Dan (in "Do It Again")
 Paul Young (in "Everytime You Go Away")
 Tom Petty (in "Don't Come Around Here No More")
 Dan Fogelberg (in "Nexus")
 George Duke and Stanley Clarke in ("Sweet Baby")
 Santana
 Roy Wood (on the songs "Open up said the World at the Door" by The Move and Wizzard's "Carlsberg Special").
 Eric Johnson
 Pearl Jam (in "Who You Are")
 Screaming Trees in "Halo of Ashes"
 Redd Kross (in "Play My Song")
 Alice in Chains (in "What the Hell Have I")
 Ugly Kid Joe (in "Cats in the Cradle")
The All-American Rejects (in ''Night Drive'')
 Torsten de Winkel
 Flower Travellin' Band
 Prince
 The Cure (1963 Coral Sitar on "If Only Tonight We Could Sleep" & "Where the Birds Always Sing" - Fascination Street-among others)
 Manic Street Preachers (in "Tsunami" and "I'm Not Working")
 The Mission (on "Beyond The Pale, Hymn (For America), Sea Of Love, Deliverance - Children & Carved In Sand albums
 Hiroshi Takano
 Miyavi
 Sugizo 
 hide
 Clarence White
 Ronnie Wood (mainly on Rolling Stones live performances of songs where Brian Jones played an actual sitar).
 Kaoru of Dir en grey
 Pat Metheny (notably on "Last Train Home")
 Led Zeppelin (on "Ten Years Gone")
 Sigh
 Steve Vai (notably on "For the Love of God")
 Rory Gallagher (in "Philby")
 Mint Royale
 Steve Miller
 Eddie Van Halen (on "Ain't Talkin' 'bout Love" & "Primary")
 Tony Hicks of The Hollies
 Blasted Mechanism
 Ruban Nielson of Unknown Mortal Orchestra
Cliff Richard - Summer Rain (played by Alan Tarney)
 The Beach Boys (in "All I Wanna Do")
 Peggy Scott & Jo Jo Benson ("Soulshake")
 The Cyrkle on Turn Down Day

Although George Harrison is generally credited with introducing the sitar into popular Western music, he is not known to have played a bona fide electric version on any recording.

On his award-winning 1969 instrumental rendition of the Joe South tune "Games People Play" saxophonist King Curtis teamed with guitarist Duane Allman on the electric sitar (he also played slide guitar). This can be found on the Duane Allman album An Anthology.

The 1971 album Somethin' Else recorded by Danny Davis and the Nashville Brass prominently featured an electric sitar, a first for the country music industry. The instrument provided accompaniment on such songs as "Snowbird", "Rose Garden", "Are You from Dixie?" and others.

Harry Chapin's original version of "Cat's in the Cradle" features the electric sitar.

On ABBA’s 1979 recording of "I Have A Dream" the refrain is played on an electric sitar. However the recording for the 2008 movie version of "Mamma Mia" featured a real bouzouki.

The 1992 album Bloody Kisses by Type O Negative used an electric sitar in the song "Can't Lose You" played by Paul Bento from the band Carnivore.

Brian Wilson's Imagination features electric sitar on "Sunshine" and "Happy Days" and played by Brent Rowan.

Glass Hammer guitarist Kamran Alan Shikoh performed electric sitar in the band's song from 2009 to his departure in 2018.

In 2010, MGMT released their album Congratulations, where the electric sitar was played on many tracks by lead singer and guitarist Andrew VanWyngarden.

Blues musician Buddy Guy played, among other guitars, a Coral electric sitar in shows on his 2010 tour.

The 2014 album Black Messiah'' by American neo-soul singer D'Angelo and backing band The Vanguard, features use of the electric sitar on tracks such as "Another Life" and "The Charade".

The 2015 song "Multi-Love" by Unknown Mortal Orchestra makes use of the electric sitar.

See also
 Sitar in popular music
 Sitar in jazz
 Danelectro
 Electric mandolin
 Electric upright bass
 Electric violin

References

External links
 Article about the Coral Sitar
 Photos of electric sitar showing closeup of sympathetic strings 

Amplified instruments
Sitars
Indian musical instruments
Electric guitars
American inventions
Rhythm section